The 1898–99 season was the 25th season of competitive football played by Rangers F.C.

Overview
Rangers played a total of 39 competitive matches during the 1898–99 season. They finished top of Scottish League Division One with a one hundred percent record of 18 wins from 18 matches.

The club ended the season without any other trophies: in the Scottish Cup, despite beating Hearts and St Mirren en route to the final, they lost to Celtic 2–0. Earlier in the season they had also lost in the final of the less important Glasgow Cup 1–0 to Queen's Park, and at its end they lost in the minor Glasgow Merchants Charity Cup final, another 2–0 loss to Celtic, also finishing as runners-up to the same opponents in the supplementary Glasgow Football League.

Regardless of these setbacks, the perfect league campaign of 1898–99 remains a unique achievement in the annals of British football.

Results
All results are written with Rangers' score first.

Scottish League Division One

Scottish Cup

Appearances

See also
 1898–99 in Scottish football
 1898–99 Scottish Cup
List of unbeaten football club seasons
Perfect season

References

Rangers F.C. seasons
Ran
Scottish football championship-winning seasons